Galmpton may refer to:

Places
 Galmpton, Torbay, a village in Devon, UK
 Galmpton, South Hams, a hamlet in Devon, UK